The 1977 Australian Touring Car Championship was a CAMS sanctioned Australian motor racing championship open to Group C Touring Cars. It was the 18th running of the Australian Touring Car Championship. The championship began at Symmons Plains Raceway on 7 March and ended at the Phillip Island Grand Prix Circuit on 20 November after eleven rounds. 1977 was the second and final time that the series incorporated the longer distance races which made up the Australian Championship of Makes. These races included the Sandown 400 and the Phillip Island 500K, although notably not the Bathurst 1000.

Reigning champion Allan Moffat (Ford Falcon) dominated the 1977 season. In addition to his victory in the non-championship Hardie-Ferodo 1000 at Bathurst, Moffat won his third Australian Touring Car Championship, leading home new Moffat Ford Dealers teammate Colin Bond for a series 1-2 result. Moffat won the first five rounds of the championship, won a total of seven out of the eleven rounds and won the title by 32 points. Bond recorded a win at Adelaide International Raceway but was put under pressure near the end of the season from Peter Brock after consecutive wins by the Holden Torana driver at Lakeside International Raceway and Sandown Raceway in the Hang Ten 400. In the end Bond finished nine points clear of Brock. The only other round win was claimed by Allan Grice (Holden Torana) at the final round at the Phillip Island Grand Prix Circuit.

In previous years the class pointscore system saw a consistent performer threaten the top of the points table. In 1977 though the best performer from the smaller cars was Ford Capri racer Lawrie Nelson who finished fourth in the points, 19 behind Brock. Holden Torana racer Bob Morris took points away from the small car class drivers by racing his Triumph Dolomite early in the series, as well as racing Lakis Manticas' Ford Capri on occasion, effectively spoiling the chances of other drivers in the under three-litre class.

Drivers
Drivers that competed in the 1977 Australian Touring Car Championship included the following:

Calendar
The 1977 Australian Touring Car Championship was contested over eleven rounds.

Classes
For points-scoring purposes, cars competing in the Australian Touring Car Championship were classified into one of two classes defined by engine capacity.
 Up to and including 3000cc
 3001 to 6000 cc

Points system
Australian Touring Car Championship points were awarded to drivers as follows:

Only the best six scores from the first seven rounds and the best two scores from the last four rounds counted towards the championship totals.

Points were awarded only where a car completed 75% of race distance and was running at the completion of the final lap.

Results
Results of the 1977 Australian Touring Car Championship were as follows:

Note: South African driver Basil van Rooyen placed fourth at Round 8 (the Hang Ten 400 at Sandown) but was not eligible to score points.

Australian Championship of Makes
The 1977 Australian Championship of Makes was awarded on the results of the final four rounds of the 1977 Australian Touring Car Championship. It was the seventh circuit racing championship for manufacturers to be awarded by CAMS and the second to carry the Australian Championship of Makes name.

Classes
For pointscoring purposes, cars competed in four classes defined by engine capacity
 Class A: Up to 1300cc
 Class B: 1301 to 2000cc
 Class C: 2001 to 3000cc
 Class D: 3001 to 6000cc

Points
Points were awarded for the six best placed cars in class in each of the four rounds on a 9-6-4-3-2-1 basis with only the highest scoring car of each make attracting points.

Results

References

External links
Autopics.com.au
Oldracephotos.com

Australian Touring Car Championship seasons
Touring Cars
Australian Championship of Makes